Michael "Mimi" Kraus (born 28 September 1983) is a former German handballer.

He started his senior career at Frisch Auf Göppingen in 2002 before moving to TBV Lemgo in 2007 and to HSV Hamburg in 2010. After winning the EHF Champions League with Hamburg he returned to play for his hometown club. In 2019 he moved to TVB 1989 Stuttgart, with another move to SG BBM Bietigheim in 2019 until 2020. He has since retired and opened a gym with his wife, German YouTuber Isabel "Bella" Kraus, who he married in 2014 and with whom he has four children, two girls and two boys.

Kraus is a German international since 2005 and competed at the 2008 Summer Olympics in Beijing, where his team placed 9th.

Kraus has a twin sister named Alena. His older brother Christian Kraus was a multiple German champion and also double youth world champion sabre fencer. His sister-in-law is TV presenter Tina Kraus.

References

1983 births
Living people
People from Göppingen
Sportspeople from Stuttgart (region)
German male handball players
Olympic handball players of Germany
Handball players at the 2008 Summer Olympics